Dunkerton is English-language toponymic surname originating from Dunkerton, Somerset, England. Notable people with the surname include:

 Julian Dunkerton (born 1965), co-founder of Superdry
 Ross Dunkerton (born 1945), Australian rally driver

See also

References 

English toponymic surnames